Verkhny Burgaltay (Deede Burgaltai) is a rural locality (a selo) in Dzhidinsky District, Republic of Buryatia, Russia. The population was 187 as of 2017. There are 15 streets.

Geography 
Verkhny Burgaltay is located 23 km west of Petropavlovka (the district's administrative centre) by road. Nizhny Burgaltay is the nearest rural locality.

References 

Rural localities in Dzhidinsky District